In formal language theory, the Chomsky–Schützenberger enumeration theorem is a theorem derived by Noam Chomsky and Marcel-Paul Schützenberger about the number of words of a given length generated by an unambiguous context-free grammar. The theorem provides an unexpected link between the theory of formal languages and abstract algebra.

Statement
In order to state the theorem, a few notions from algebra and formal language theory are needed.

Let  denote the set of nonnegative integers.

A context-free grammar is said to be unambiguous if every string generated by the grammar admits a unique parse tree 
or, equivalently, only one leftmost derivation.
Having established the necessary notions, the theorem is stated as follows. 

Chomsky–Schützenberger theorem.

Usage

Asymptotic estimates

The theorem can be used in analytic combinatorics to estimate the number of words of length n generated by a given unambiguous context-free grammar, as n grows large. The following example is given by : the unambiguous context-free grammar G over the alphabet {0,1} has start symbol S and the following rules

S → M | U
M → 0M1M | ε
U → 0S | 0M1U.

To obtain an algebraic representation of the power series  associated with a given context-free grammar G, one transforms the grammar into a system of equations. This is achieved by replacing each occurrence of a terminal symbol by x, each occurrence of ε by the integer '1', each occurrence of '→' by '=', and each occurrence of '|' by '+', respectively. The operation of concatenation at the right-hand-side of each rule corresponds to the multiplication operation in the equations thus obtained. This yields the following system of equations:

S = M + U
M = M²x² + 1
U = Sx + MUx²

The equation system can be resolved after S, resulting in a single algebraic equation:

.

This quadratic equation has two solutions for S, one of which is the algebraic power series . By applying methods from complex analysis to this equation, the number  of words of length n generated by G can be estimated, as n grows large. In this case, one obtains
 but  for each . See  for a detailed exposition.

The following example is from :which simplifies to

Inherent ambiguity

In classical formal language theory, the theorem can be used to prove that certain context-free languages are inherently ambiguous.
For example, the  Goldstine language  over the alphabet  consists of the words

It is comparably easy to show that the language  is context-free . The harder part is to show that there does not exist an unambiguous grammar that generates . This can be proved as follows:
.
By the Chomsky-Schützenberger theorem, one can conclude that  does not admit an unambiguous context-free grammar. See  for detailed account.

References

Noam Chomsky
Formal languages
Theorems in discrete mathematics